Funeral Diner was a screamo band from Half Moon Bay, California, located near San Francisco. During their last few years, the band established a strong cult fanbase through a near constant string of releases and a touring schedule during which they visited the United States, Europe, and Japan.

The band had a large catalog of splits and compilation tracks on various records. They rarely pressed CDs, and kept many of their releases in limited quantities and one-time pressings, jumping from label to label, though their last few major recordings were released by Alone Records. Their most recent full-length, The Underdark, was issued on Alone in 2005.

Members of the band were previously affiliated with other groups such as Nexus Six, Portraits of Past, Living War Room, Lost Ground, Sheep Squeeze, and Takaru. After the breakup, members have gone on to form Stirling Says, ...Who Calls So Loud, Pills, and Lemonade.

Though rooted in first wave emo, hardcore punk and early screamo characteristics, the band later included elements of post-rock. Funeral Diner's albums have attracted significant coverage from rock press outlets.

Members

Final Lineup
 Seth Babb: vocals
 Daniel Bajda: guitar/vocals
 Matthew Bajda: drums
 David Mello: guitar
 Benjamin Steidel: bass

Former Members
Sean O' Shea: bass
Rob Beckstrom: bass
Andy Radin: bass
Phil Benson: vocals

Discography

Studio albums

Extended plays

Split releases

Compilation albums

Compilation Appearances

References

External links
 Alone Records
 Funeral Diner's Myspace
Funeral Diner Fan Site
 Funeral Diner lyrics

Musical groups from the San Francisco Bay Area
American emo musical groups
American screamo musical groups
Half Moon Bay, California
Musical groups established in 1998
Musical groups disestablished in 2007
Cosmic Note artists